The 2014 Türk Telecom İzmir Cup was a professional tennis tournament played on hard courts. It was the seventh edition of the tournament which is part of the 2014 ATP Challenger Tour. It took place in İzmir, Turkey between 15 and 21 September 2014.

Singles main-draw entrants

Seeds

 1 Rankings are as of September 8, 2014.

Other entrants
The following players received wildcards into the singles main draw:
  Tuna Altuna
  Baris Erguden
  Cem Ilkel
  Efe Yurtaçan

The following player entered into the singles main draw as a protected ranking:
  Philipp Petzschner

The following players received entry from the qualifying draw:
  Victor Baluda
  Mikhail Ledovskikh 
  Yaraslav Shyla 
  Tucker Vorster

Champions

Singles

 Borna Ćorić def.  Malek Jaziri, 6–1, 6–7(7–9), 6–4

Doubles

 Ken Skupski /  Neal Skupski vs.  Malek Jaziri /  Alexander Kudryavtsev, 6–1, 6–4

External links
Official Website

 
Turk Telecom Izmir Cup
Türk Telecom İzmir Cup
Türk Telecom İzmir Cup